Jock Landale (born 25 October 1995) is an Australian professional basketball player for the Phoenix Suns of the National Basketball Association (NBA). He played college basketball for the Saint Mary's Gaels.

Landale also represents the Australian national team. He was part of the Australian team that won bronze at the 2020 Tokyo Olympics. A highlight for him at the Olympics was scoring 18 points in Australia's Group B 86–83 win over Italy.

Early life
Landale was an early basketball prospect in Australia, but gave up the game until picking it up again at Geelong Grammar School in Corio, Victoria. A growth spurt that saw him grow almost a full foot from year 9 to year 12 raised his profile as a prospect and helped him secure a scholarship to Saint Mary's College, an American NCAA Division I school.

College career
Landale was a bench player as a freshman, but increased his role as a sophomore and enjoyed a breakout season as a junior, in part due to improved conditioning. At times, Landale had dominant performances, such as the 5 January 2017 win over BYU in which he went 11-13 from the field for 26 points. He averaged 16.9 points and 9.5 rebounds, leading the Gaels to the 2017 NCAA tournament. Making his numbers more impressive is that only one of the 351 Division I men's teams averaged fewer possessions per game than the Gaels that season. At the close of the season, he was named first-team All-West Coast Conference (WCC).

Landale scored 33 points and grabbed 12 rebounds in an overtime loss to Georgia on 26 November. On 22 January 2018, Landale was named NBC Sports player of the week, after contributing 24 points and 12 rebounds in a win versus Gonzaga and 32 points and seven rebounds in a victory over Pacific. He averaged 21.5 points, 10.2 rebounds and 1.1 blocked shots per game as a senior. Landale was named West Coast Conference player of the year while his teammate Emmett Naar was named to the First Team All-Conference.

Professional career

Partizan (2018–2019)
After going undrafted in the 2018 NBA draft, Landale signed with the Atlanta Hawks for NBA Summer League. He signed a two-year deal with Partizan of the ABA League on 31 July 2018. Over 24 ABA League games, Landale averaged 12 points and 5.6 rebounds, while shooting 56.6% from the field. For his performances, he was named to the 2018–19 ABA League Ideal Starting Five.

Žalgiris Kaunas (2019–2020)
On 20 May 2019, Landale signed a 1+1 season deal with the Lithuanian champions Žalgiris Kaunas. Landale played for the Milwaukee Bucks in 2019 Las Vegas Summer League. In a game against Real Madrid in January 2020, Landale donated $100 for every three-pointer and dunk to help fight the Australian bushfires. Landale averaged 11.0 points, 4.4 rebounds and 1.0 assist per game. He parted ways with the team on 3 August 2020.

Melbourne United (2020–2021)
On 10 December 2020, Landale signed one-year deal with Melbourne United for the 2020–21 NBL season. Landale led the United into the 2021 NBL Grand Final against the defending champions, the Perth Wildcats. In Game 1, he posted 17 points, seven rebounds, three assists, two steals and two blocks in a 73–70 win. Landale helped the team take a 2–0 series lead after logging a double-double with 12 points and 17 rebounds. In Game 3, he registered a game-high 15 points, nine rebounds, two assists, two steals and two blocks in an 81–76 victory. After leading the United to a 3–0 sweep in the best-of-five series, Landale won the NBL Grand Final MVP Award. He finished the season averaging 16.4 points, 7.8 rebounds, 2.3 assists and 1.4 blocks per game and was awarded the Melbourne United MVP.

San Antonio Spurs (2021–2022)
On 20 August 2021, Landale signed with the San Antonio Spurs. Landale's first NBA career start and his first NBA double-double came on January 15, 2022 in a 101 - 94 win over the Los Angeles Clippers where he recorded 10 points and 11 rebounds as the Spurs' starting center.

Phoenix Suns (2022–present)
On June 30, 2022, Landale was traded, alongside Dejounte Murray, to the Atlanta Hawks in exchange for Danilo Gallinari and multiple future first-round picks. 

Less than a week later, on July 6, he was traded to the Phoenix Suns in exchange for cash considerations.

Career statistics

NBA

|-
| style="text-align:left;"|2021–22
| style="text-align:left;"|San Antonio
| 54 || 1 || 10.9 || .495 || .326 || .829 || 2.6 || .8 || .2 || .3 || 4.9
|- class="sortbottom"
| style="text-align:center;" colspan="2"|Career
| 54 || 1 || 10.9 || .495 || .326 || .829 || 2.6 || .8 || .2 || .3 || 4.9

NBL

|-
| style="text-align:left;"|2020–21
| style="text-align:left;"|Melbourne
| 41 || 40 || 27.5 || .544 || .389 || .712 || 7.9 || 2.4 || .6 || 1.5 || 16.4

EuroLeague

|-
| style="text-align:left;"| 2019–20
| style="text-align:left;"| Žalgiris
| 25 || 19 || 20.3 || .646 || .302 || .821 || 4.4 || 1.0 || .5 || .4 || 11.0 || 10.4

EuroCup

|-
| style="text-align:left;"| 2018–19
| style="text-align:left;"| Partizan
| 16 || 12 || 25.1 || .683 || .381 || .481 || 6.5 || 1.8 || .5 || .7 || 11.2 || 15.1

See also
 List of foreign basketball players in Serbia

References

External links
 Saint Mary's Gaels bio
 Jock Landale at aba-liga.com
 Jock Londale at euroleague.net
 Jock Landale at nbl.com.au
 Jock Landale at RealGM.com
 

1995 births
Living people
2019 FIBA Basketball World Cup players
ABA League players
All-American college men's basketball players
Australian expatriate basketball people in Lithuania
Australian expatriate basketball people in Serbia
Australian expatriate basketball people in the United States
Australian men's basketball players
Austin Spurs players
Basketball players at the 2020 Summer Olympics
Basketball League of Serbia players
Basketball players from Melbourne
BC Žalgiris players
Centers (basketball)
KK Partizan players
Medalists at the 2020 Summer Olympics
Melbourne United players
National Basketball Association players from Australia
Olympic basketball players of Australia
Olympic bronze medalists for Australia
Olympic medalists in basketball
Phoenix Suns players
Power forwards (basketball)
Saint Mary's Gaels men's basketball players
San Antonio Spurs players
Sportsmen from Victoria (Australia)
Undrafted National Basketball Association players
People educated at Geelong Grammar School